Touggourt is a district in Touggourt Province, Algeria. It was named after its capital, Touggourt. It is the smallest, the most populated, and most densely populated district in the province. As of the 2008 census, the district had a population of 146,108.

Municipalities
The district is further divided into 4 communes:
Touggourt
Nezla
Tebesbest
Zaouia El Abidia

References

Districts of Ouargla Province